The Newport River is a small river in North Carolina that runs approximately twelve miles (twenty kilometers) southeast through the town of Newport with its mouth opening into Bogue Sound, between Morehead City and Beaufort. It is popular for flatwater paddling and canoeing.

References

Rivers of North Carolina
Rivers of Carteret County, North Carolina
Tributaries of the White Oak River